Liérganes is a municipality located in the autonomous community of Cantabria, Spain. According to the 2007 census, the city has a population of 2,391 inhabitants.

Towns
Bucarrero
Calgar
Casa del Monte
El Condado
La Costera
Extremera
La Herrán
Liérganes (capital)
El Mercadillo
Las Porquerizas
Los Prados
La Quieva
La Rañada
El Rellano
Rubalcaba
La Vega
Pámanes
Somarriba
Tarriba

References

Municipalities in Cantabria